Róbert Nóvak (born 6 August 1970) is a retired Slovak football midfielder.

References

1970 births
Living people
Slovak footballers
FC Slušovice players
FK Dubnica players
ŠK Slovan Bratislava players
FC VSS Košice players
1. FK Příbram players
FC Petržalka players
Czech First League players
Association football midfielders
Slovak expatriate footballers
Expatriate footballers in the Czech Republic
Slovak expatriate sportspeople in the Czech Republic